Huāgōu (花沟) may refer to:

 Huagou, Woyang County, town in Anhui, China
 Huagou, Gaoqing County, town in Gaoqing County, Shandong, China